John Stubbs (15 October 1931 – 14 August 2020) was an Australian cricketer. He played three first-class matches for Western Australia between 1956/57 and 1961/62.

See also
 List of Western Australia first-class cricketers

References

External links
 

1931 births
2020 deaths
Australian cricketers
Western Australia cricketers
People from Collie, Western Australia